Gara M'hamed Ali is a hill in Taţāwīn, Tunisia.

References

Geography of Tunisia